Product engineering refer to the process of designing and developing a device, assembly, or system such that it be produced as an item for sale through some product manufacturing process. Product engineering usually entails activity dealing with issues of cost, producibility, quality, performance, reliability, serviceability, intended lifespan and user features. These product characteristics are generally all sought in the attempt to make the resulting product attractive to its intended market and a successful contributor to the business of the organization that intends to offer the product to that market. It includes design, development and transitioning to manufacturing of the product. The term encompasses developing the concept of the product and the design and development of its hardware and software components. After the initial design and development is done, transitioning the product to manufacture it in volumes is considered part of product engineering.

For example, the engineering of a digital camera would include defining the feature set, design of the optics, the physical, aesthetic and ergonomic design of the packaging, developing the various electrical and mechanical component for the capture, processing and storage of image and developing the software that allows the user to see the pictures, store them in memory and download them to a computer. 

Product engineering is an engineering discipline that deals with both design and manufacturing aspects of a product.

Area of responsibility

 Product engineers define the yield road map and drive the fulfillment during ramp-up and volume production,
 Identify and realize measures for yield improvement, test optimization and product cost-ability methods,
 Define qualification plan and perform feasibility analysis.

Product engineers are the technical interface between the component development team and the production side (Front End and Back End), especially after the development phase and qualifications when the high volume production is running.

Product engineers improve the product quality and secure the product reliability by balancing the cost of tests and tests coverage that could impact the production fall-off. They support failure analysis request from customers.

Knowledge and skills

The job requires the product engineer to have a very good working knowledge of:

 Statistical methods and tools
 Manufacturing process
 Software, hardware and systems implementation 
 Product reliability and qualification
 Physical analysis methods
 Computer-aided design and simulation programs
 Specific technology
 Strong product Knowledge
 Strong analytic work methodology and problem solving skills
 Continuous Improvement Knowledge

Tools
A product engineer will use a wide range of tools and software, possibly including:
20/20, AutoCad, CATIA, PTC Creo, Solidworks, Unigraphics, Labview, JMP, DataConductor.

See also
Industrial engineering
Process engineering

References

External links
 Application note "Yield Learning Flow Provides Faster Production Ramp"
 Tutorial about yield impact

Semiconductor device fabrication
Electronic engineering
Engineering disciplines